Margaret D. Lowman, Ph.D. a.k.a. Canopy Meg (born December 23, 1953) is an American biologist, educator, ecologist, writer, explorer, and public speaker. Her expertise involves canopy ecology, canopy plant-insect relationships, and constructing canopy walkways.

Nicknamed the "real-life Lorax" and "Einstein of the treetops", Lowman pioneered the science of canopy ecology. She is known as the "mother of canopy research." For more than 30 years, she has designed hot-air balloons and walkways for treetop exploration to solve mysteries in the world's forests, especially insect pests and ecosystem health.  She works to map the canopy for biodiversity and to champion forest conservation around the world.

Lowman's academic training includes Williams College (BA, Biology) in 1976; Aberdeen University (MSc, Ecology) in 1978;  Sydney University (Ph.D, Botany); and Tuck School of Business (Executive Management).

Research
Lowman has authored more than 100 peer-reviewed scientific publications and several books including Life in the Treetops (1999), It's a Jungle Up There (2006), and The Arbornaut (2021). From 1978-1989 Lowman lived in Australia and worked on canopy research in rain forests and dry forests. She was instrumental in determining the cause of Eucalypt Dieback Syndrome in Australia, and worked with forest conservation and regeneration. She taught at Williams College in Massachusetts, pioneering many aspects of forest canopy research. During her time there she spearheaded the construction of the first canopy walkway in North America.

Work
Lowman currently serves as the Director of Global Initiatives and Senior Scientist for Plant Conservation at the California Academy of Sciences. Her role is to strategize and promote the Academy’s mission for sustainability science, and to disseminate her team’s accomplishments to groups ranging from elementary classes to corporate executives to international conferences.

Lowman previously served as Chief of Science & Sustainability at the California Academy of Sciences. In this role, Lowman was responsible for the Academy's programs of scientific research and exploration as well as its programs addressing the challenge of sustaining life on earth. She led their twenty-first century strategy of integrating research with sustainability initiatives both local and global. As the Academy’s inaugural Chief of Science and Sustainability, she re-organized internal operations to prioritize relevant science, sustainability, collections and efficient financial practices.

Prior to this Lowman was a Research Professor at North Carolina State University and the founding director of North Carolina’s innovative Nature Research Center at the NC Museum of Natural Sciences. Lowman oversaw the creation, construction, staffing, and programming of this research wing in partnership with the NC University system. She was then promoted to Senior Scientist/Director of Academic Partnerships & Global Initiatives for the entire Museum. She served as the primary advocate for NRC and aimed to promote its mission.

She has served as Vice President of the Ecological Society of America; Treasurer of the Association for Tropical Biology and Conservation; Executive Director of the TREE Foundation; Board of Directors for The Explorers Club and Earthwatch; and former Climate Change Adviser to Alex Sink, CFO of the Florida cabinet. Previously, she served as Director of Environmental Initiatives at New College of Florida, CEO of The Marie Selby Botanical Gardens, and Professor of Biology and Environmental Studies at Williams College.

Lowman believes in conservation through education which is a very strong theme in It's a Jungle Up There. She has been involved in several JASON Project education programs and numerous other conservation education initiatives. Her books on canopy ecology are not just about her field work but add dimensions in what it's like to be a woman in a male dominated profession, and what it's like to be a single parent mom. Her sons co-authored It's a Jungle Up There and added their insights on how their mother's career and their family not only survived, but thrived. Her youngest son, James Burgess, went on to co-found the organization OpenBiome.

Organizations
In 1999 Lowman became the Executive Director of Marie Selby Botanical Gardens in Sarasota, Florida where she helped raise donations over 100 percent and increased membership by "friend-raising". The Selby Garden's lecture series "Tuesdays In The Tropics" was well attended by the community with topics such as "Does Money Grow on Trees? Challenges of Rain Forest Conservation". During her tenure, the Gardens' budget shifted into the black from previous years and the membership more than doubled. When the board shifted away from a botanical and conservation-oriented mission, Lowman accepted an offer at New College of Florida as Professor of Biology and Environmental Studies. The Center for Canopy Ecology relocated from Selby Gardens to New College following Lowman.

Lowman co-founded the TREE Foundation, along with Sarasota non-profit accountant Mike Pender and community leader, Bob Richardson. She still serves as its
Executive Director, and the Foundation supports Tree Research, Exploration, and Education (hence, TREE). The Foundation has supported scholarships for students from developing countries to learn about forest conservation in the U.S., built the Myakka River canopy walkway (America's first public treetop walk), conserved valuable forest fragments, the church forests, in Ethiopia with a unique science-religion partnership, and continuously promotes education of youth about forest conservation.

Canopy access
Lowman has developed an expertise for using different canopy access techniques such as slingshot fired ropes, hot air balloons with sleds, canopy cranes, and canopy walkways. In 2000 the Myakka River State Park canopy walkway opened after a 1997 proposal from Lowman. It includes a walkway through Florida Oak-Palm Hammock and a tower that reveals a "sea of green" above the treetops. It has given visitors a view of the trees that changes people's perspective on the importance of forest conservation.

Awards and honors
Cover review in the New York Times Sunday Book Review for Life in the Treetops, 1999
Margaret Douglas Medal for Excellence in Conservation Education from the Garden Club of America
Williams College Bicentennial Medal for achievements in tropical botany, 2000
Girls, Inc. Visionary Award for Public Science & Education Outreach, 2000
American Association of Botanical Gardens and Arboreta (AABGA) Award for Program Excellence in creating two canopy walkways, one at Selby Gardens with Americans with Disabilities Act accessibility, and one at Myakka State Park, 2001
Ecological Society of America, Eugene Odum Prize for Excellence in Ecology Education, 2002
Kilby Laureate Medalist for work as a rainforest canopy expert, 2002
Asteroid (10739) Lowman named by Carolyn Shoemaker of the US Department of the Interior, 2003
Woman in Power Award, National Council of Jewish Women (NCJW), 2003
Selected three times as Chief Scientist, The JASON Project in Science Education (2004, 1999, 1994 in Panama, Peru and Belize, respectively)
Aldo Leopold Leadership Fellow, 2006
Lifetime Achievement Award for Conservation from Sarasota County, 2006
Roy Chapman Andrews Society Distinguished Explorer Award, 2014
Mendel Medal for achievements in science and spirit
Lowell Thomas Medal for discoveries in the canopy
Fulbright Senior Specialist Scholarship to India
National Geographic funds to conserve church forests in Ethiopia and to survey canopy biodiversity in Cameroon and Colombia.

Selected publications

Books
Lowman, M.D. 1974. Some Aspects of the Fabric of Life. U.S. Department of Health, Education and Welfare 204 pp.
Heatwole, H. and Lowman, M.D. 1986. Dieback: The Death of an Australian Landscape. Reed & Co. 150 pp.
Lowman, M.D. (ed.) 1992. Ecology of Hopkins Forest. Williams College Printers. 100 pp.
Lowman, M.D. and Nadkarni, N.M. (eds.) 1995. Forest Canopies. Academic Press 624 pp. (Second Edition in paperback 1996)
Lowman, M.D. 1999. Life in the Treetops. Yale University Press. (Editions in German, Chinese and Korean)
Lowman, M.D. and Rinker, H.B. (eds.) 2004. Forest Canopies. Elsevier Press. (All articles peer-reviewed, with several chapters written by M.D. Lowman)
Lowman, M.D.,  Burgess, E. and  Burgess, J. 2006. It’s a Jungle Out There – More Tales from the Treetops. Yale University Press.
Lowman, M.D., Schowalter, T. and Franklin, J. 2011. Methods in Forest Canopy Research. University of California Press.
Lowman, M.D., Devy, S. and Ganesh, T. 2013. Treetops at Risk. Springer Verlag
Lowman, M.D. and Mulat, W. 2014. Beza – Who Saved the Forests of Ethiopia, One Church at a Time. Peppertree Press (children’s book), both English and Amharic versions.

References

External links
Margaret Lowman "Canopy Meg" Website
Margaret Lowman Tree Foundation Website

1953 births
Living people
American science writers
American ecologists
Women ecologists
Williams College alumni
Alumni of the University of Aberdeen
University of Sydney alumni
Tuck School of Business alumni
New College of Florida faculty
Forest conservation
Forestry researchers
Forestry academics
Women in forestry
North Carolina State University faculty
Fellows of the Ecological Society of America
People associated with the California Academy of Sciences
People from Elmira, New York
Scientific American people